Ectopic enamel is an abnormality in the shape of teeth. It is tooth enamel that is found in an unusual location, such as at the root of a tooth.

Developmental tooth disorders